South Berlin is an unincorporated community in Marshall County, in the U.S. state of Tennessee.

History
South Berlin had its start when the railroad was extended to that point. A post office called South Berlin was established in 1878, and remained in operation until 1919.

References

Unincorporated communities in Marshall County, Tennessee
Unincorporated communities in Tennessee